Pseudagrion caffrum, the springwater sprite is a species of damselfly in the family Coenagrionidae. It is found in Lesotho, South Africa and Eswatini. Its natural habitats include montane streams with grassy banks.

A medium-sized damselfly (length 31–3 mm; wingspan 39–47 mm).  The face is black and yellow and it lacks post-ocular spots. The eyes are black above and yellow below. The synthorax is dark blue above and the sides are pale, pruinescent blue. The abdomen is dark blue above and yellow green below, ageing to pruinescent grey.

References

External links

 Pseudagrion caffrum on African Dragonflies and Damselflies Online

Coenagrionidae
Insects of South Africa
Insects described in 1839